Murupeaca is a genus of longhorn beetles of the subfamily Lamiinae, containing the following species:

 Murupeaca mocoia Martins & Galileo, 1993
 Murupeaca pinimatinga Martins & Galileo, 1992
 Murupeaca tavakiliani Galileo & Martins, 2004

References

Hemilophini